Little Man Tate is a 1991 American drama film directed by Jodie Foster (in her directorial debut) from a screenplay written by Scott Frank. The film stars Adam Hann-Byrd as Fred Tate, a seven-year-old child prodigy who struggles to self-actualize in social and psychological settings that largely fail to accommodate his intelligence. It also stars Foster,  Dianne Wiest,  Harry Connick Jr.,  David Hyde Pierce, Debi Mazar and P.J. Ochlan.

Little Man Tate was released theatrically on October 18, 1991 by Orion Pictures to critical and commercial success. Reviewers praised Foster's direction, Frank's screenplay and the  performances of the cast. The film grossed $25 million domestically, on a  $10 million budget.

Plot
Dede Tate is a young working-class woman of average intelligence raising her seven-year-old son, Fred. Fred shows every indication of being a genius. Fred's reading and mathematics abilities are remarkable, and he plays the piano "at competition level,"  but his intellect has isolated him from his public school classmates.

Fred's abilities come to the attention of Jane Grierson, a former music prodigy and now a psychologist running a school for gifted children. She asks permission from Dede to admit Fred to the school, in order to develop his intellectual gifts in ways that a public school cannot. Dede is reluctant, preferring that Fred have a more normal upbringing, but when no friends come to Fred's seventh birthday party, Dede consents.

Fred joins other brilliant young people, and participates in Jane's  Odyssey of the Mind event for part of the spring. There he meets one of his heroes, who is one of Jane's prized pupils, the brilliant but slightly bizarre "Mathemagician" Damon Wells, a whiz at math who wears a black cape wherever he goes. After Fred unintentionally upstages Damon at one of the competitions at Odyssey of the Mind, Damon is upset with Fred. Damon however warms up to Fred when out horseback riding on Jane's ranch, and is Fred's first insight to a world outside academia. Damon tells him, "it's not the size of a man's IQ that matters; it's how he uses it". Jane attempts to become more nurturing, but is unable to relate to Fred as anything other than a case study.

Fred is later enrolled at a university, where he studies quantum physics while his mother, aunt and cousins travel to Florida for the summer. An adult student named Eddie accidentally hits Fred with a globe when goofing around. To make it up to Fred, Eddie takes him out for a ride on his moped and shows him things such as how to shoot pool; it is good for Fred to spend time with someone who is not a genius. However, when Fred walks into Eddie's room while Eddie is in bed with a coed, Fred runs out and Eddie chases after him. Eddie explains that he cannot be a babysitter for Fred; although he enjoys Fred's company, Fred needs to find friends closer to his own age. The return to isolation takes its toll on Fred, as he suffers from nightmares in which he is treated as a freak and an outsider.

Jane is asked to bring Fred onto a TV panel discussion show on the topic of gifted children. Fred attends but breaks down. He claims his mother is dead, and recites a childish poem (a word-for-word repetition of a poem by one of his former grade school classmates) before taking off his microphone and walking out of the studio.  Dede witnesses some of this as it is being broadcast, and flies back to New York.  Jane is unable to find Fred, but Dede discovers him back at their apartment, and embraces him.

One year later, Fred has adjusted to the pressures of being a child genius, particularly after an even younger student is admitted to Jane's school.  Dede hosts a well-attended birthday party for Fred, reconciling Fred's emotional development with his intellect.

Cast
 Adam Hann-Byrd as Fred Tate
Alex Lee as Fred Tate Age 2
Geoffrey C. York as Infant Fred Tate
 Jodie Foster as Dede Tate
 Dianne Wiest as Jane Grierson
 Harry Connick Jr. as Eddie
 David Hyde Pierce as Garth Emmerick
 Debi Mazar as Gina
 P.J. Ochlan as Damon Wells
 Michael Shulman as Matt Montini
 Carolyn Lawrence as Sorority Girl
 Celia Weston as Miss Nimvel
 Danitra Vance as Clinic Doctor
 Nathan Lee as Matt's Teammate
 Richard Fredette as The Bartender
 George Plimpton as Winston F. Buckner
 Elizabeth H. Frietsch as Live Wire Girl
 Jennifer Trier as Grierson Institute Teacher
 Lawrence Gallegos as Fraternity Guy
 D. Michael Pierce as College Student
 Evan Prizant as Child Star, The Adding Machine
 Ellen McElduff as Make Up Woman
 Bob Balaban as Quizmaster (uncredited)

Production
Jodie Foster, who is herself a former child prodigy, was immediately impressed by the film's narrative and was interested in directing it. Orion Pictures was on the verge of bankruptcy at the time and was skeptical about Foster directing the film. They ultimately agreed after she offered to act in the film without payment. The film includes certain autobiographical elements from Foster's life.

Most of the film was shot in Over-the-Rhine and downtown Cincinnati.  Other locations include the Cincinnati neighborhood of Clifton; the Village of Indian Hill; the University of Cincinnati's McMicken Hall; Miami University's Alumni Hall, Upham Hall, Hall Auditorium and the Tau Kappa Epsilon Fraternity House, in Oxford, Ohio; and both the Wexner Center and the Ohio Theater in Columbus, Ohio.

Reception

Box office
In its opening weekend in North America, Little Man Tate was #6 at the box office, grossing $2.3 million. The film grossed a total of $25 million domestically, against a $10 million budget becoming a commercial success.

Critical response
The review aggregator website Rotten Tomatoes gives the film an approval rating of 73% based on 30 reviews, with an average rating of 6.30/10. On Metacritic, the film has a weighted average score of 71 out of 100 based on 5 reviews, indicating "generally favourable reviews".

Roger Ebert gave the film three and a half stars out of four and commented on how the film's premise is similar to Foster's life, saying; "Little Man Tate is the kind of movie you enjoy watching; it's about interesting people finding out about themselves and as Foster creates this little man who sees a lot and knows a lot but is only gradually beginning to understand a lot, we can hear echoes, perhaps, of a young girl who once found it more interesting to study French than get her picture in the fan magazines".

References

External links
 
 
 
 

1991 films
1991 drama films
American drama films
Films about autism
Films about educators
Films about music and musicians
Films directed by Jodie Foster
Films set in Cincinnati
Miami University
Orion Pictures films
Films with screenplays by Scott Frank
Films produced by Scott Rudin
Films scored by Mark Isham
Tate, Fred
1991 directorial debut films
Films about mother–son relationships
1990s English-language films
1990s American films
Films shot in Cincinnati